Nazar Soýunow (23 August 1936 – 25 March 2021) was a Turkmen politician. He was a member of the People's Council of Turkmenistan from 1990 to 1994, Deputy Chairman of the Cabinet of Ministers of Turkmenistan from 1992 to 1994, and Minister of Oil and Mineral Resources from April to July 1994.

References

1936 births
2021 deaths
Turkmenistan politicians
Foreign ministers of Turkmenistan
Government ministers of Turkmenistan
Communist Party of Turkmenistan politicians
People from Balkanabat